Towards the Light (Danish: Mod lyset) is a 1919 Danish silent film directed by Holger-Madsen and starring Asta Nielsen. It was her last film in her native Denmark.

Cast

References

Bibliography
 Sundholm, John & Thorsen, Isak & Andersson, Lars Gustaf & Hedling, Olof & Iversen, Gunnar & Moller, Birgir Thor. Historical Dictionary of Scandinavian Cinema. Scarecrow Press, 2012.

External links

1919 films
Films directed by Holger-Madsen
Danish silent films
Danish black-and-white films